Elizabeth Bennet(t) may refer to:

 Elizabeth Bennet (married name Darcy), the protagonist of Jane Austen's novel, Pride and Prejudice 
 Elizabeth Bennett (stage actress) (1714–1791), British stage actress
 Elizabeth Bennett (judge), Canadian judge
 Elizabeth Bennett (actress), English television actress
 Elizabeth Ann Bennett (born 1978), American television actress

See also
 Eliza Bennett (born 1992), English actress and singer
 Betty T. Bennett (1935–2006), American professor of literature